Temple Beth El in Jefferson City, Missouri, was built in 1883. It is located at 318 Monroe St. and has been in continuous use at that location since its construction. Shabbat services are led by members of the congregation every Friday night, and holiday services are also observed. The congregation is affiliated with the URJ (Union for Reform Judaism). According to the Wikipedia list of oldest synagogues in the US Temple Beth El is the oldest synagogue building still in use west of the Mississippi.

History 

According to the Jefferson City, Daily Tribune, Oct 14, 1883, the Jewish congregation of Jefferson City built for themselves a synagogue on the west side of Monroe St between High and McCarty.  The building is 38'x25' and constructed of brick and cut stone trimmings. The interior is neatly furnished and includes a Torah scroll handwritten on parchment. The original Torah written in 1811 is still in use today. The Temple was designed by prominent local architect, Frank B. Miller, who also designed the Cole County Courthouse and Central Missouri Trust Company. A plaque was placed in the building by the 12 founders in appreciation of women in the Hebrew Ladies Sewing Society who "by untiring exertion and labor have secured and presented to the congregation a house and a lot dedicated to the service of the most high" The wording on the plaque is noteworthy because the women are listed by their first names, which was unusual for the time.

Most of the early members of the congregation were merchants with stores on High Street selling clothing, shoes, and saddles including the Globe Shoe and Clothing Store, Straus Saddlery, Goldman Clothing Store, The Reliable Store, Czarlinsky's and later Herman's Department Store and Leeds.

On September 19, 1954, Temple Beth El hosted Missouri's ceremonies during the tercentenary of the first Jewish settlement in North America. Governor Phil Donnelly signed a proclamation recognizing the event in October 1957.

Temple Beth El is located within the downtown Jefferson City Historic District. Additional information about Temple Beth El can be found at the State Historical Society of Missouri.

See also
 List of synagogues in the United States
 List of the oldest synagogues in the United States

External links

References 

Buildings and structures in Jefferson City, Missouri
Reform synagogues in Missouri
Synagogues completed in 1883
1883 establishments in Missouri